North Georgia College & State University was an institution of higher education that began as a branch of the Georgia College of Agriculture and Mechanical at the University of Georgia in 1873. It was merged in 2013 with Gainesville State College to create the University of North Georgia.

North Georgia Agricultural College 1871–1929

Early history (1871–1900)
North Georgia Agricultural College officially opened classes in January 1873. Its inception was the result of Morrill Act and the efforts of William Pierce Price. Funds from the Morrill Act were given to the University of Georgia which established the Georgia College of Agriculture and Mechanical Arts in 1872. Price, a politician and native of Dahlonega, persuaded the regents to establish a branch of the college. The school's main building was the old federal mint located near the square in Dahlonega. The mint was in operation from 1838-1861 when it was closed due to the civil war.

When the college officially opened it had 177 students, 98 men and 79 women making it the first co-educational institute in the state. David W. Lewis, a planter, lawyer, and agricultural reformer was the first president. By 1876 the Superior Court of Lumpkin County had granted the college the ability to award degrees and in 1879 the first degrees were awarded. 3 young men and 1 young woman received degrees making it the first institution in the state to award degrees to women. The young woman, Willie Lewis, was the daughter of president Lewis. Reluctant to award a bachelor's degree to a woman Chancellor Patrick Mell justified his decision by saying that older married men had received degrees and they were not technically bachelors. 

Although the college was founded as an agricultural college an agriculture department was not established until 1902. Instead the focus was on a liberal arts education. The core curriculum consisted of Latin, Greek, mathematics, natural science, English, and philosophy. In 1875, the school began training teachers because of a recommendation from Governor James Milton Smith. The Morrill Act required all students in land-grant colleges to receive some military training and the college only had one military instructor at a time, until Congress passed the National Defense Act of 1916 and the college established an ROTC the same year.

A fire destroyed the main academic building, the old mint, in December 1878. Funds were raised over the next several years as classes were held in smaller buildings around campus. Construction began to rebuild the building on the foundations of the old mint in June 1879. In 1885 President Lewis fell ill and died. In the 1880s and 1890s the institution saw decreasing enrollment due to economic hardships in this part of the state and competition from other schools.

Turn of the 20th century and World War I (1900–1929)
In the 20th century, the world, the nation, the state, and North Georgia began to change. Although the school was isolated due to lack of good roads or railroads it was able to receive power from the generator at the Consolidated Mine to have electric lights. It also had a telephone. In 1904 Gustavus Richard Glenn became president and served until 1922 the longest tenure of any other president. Glenn had been The State School Commissioner. The Military College of Georgia was added to the title of the college.

Another fire ravaged the campus in 1911 destroying Boswick Hall, an academic building. This allowed the college to receive funds to build what was then called the industrial building in 1914. Because of the military presence of the college enrollment boomed during World War I. When Congress created the National Defense Act of 1916 that created ROTC the college used to train troops for the war and retained .

The college dropped the agricultural department and the designation from the colleges name in 1929 renaming the school as North Georgia College. Because of the depression and the over proliferation of colleges in the state the institution was reduced to junior college in 1932.

Junior college 1932–1946
The Reorganization Act of 1931 reduced the number of state colleges from 26 to 10, created the Board of Regents, and reduced NGC to the rank of junior college. Jonathan Clark Rogers became president in 1933 and set his sights on improving and expanding the campus. At this time the campus consisted of 3 brick buildings and two wooden ones and more were needed to allow increased enrollment. After sprucing up all the current buildings on campus Rogers began work on constructing a girls dormitory. Completed in 1936 the students wanted to name the building Rogers Hall because of the work that was done by the president. Instead Rogers named the building after chancellor of the Board of Regents Steadman Vincent Sanford. Rogers immediate interests then turned to a boys dormitory although he had many plans in mind. When it was completed in 1938 the boys dormitory was named Barnes Hall after the prominent faculty member John C. "Daddy" Barnes. The next construction project for the campus is currently known as the Nix Center but at the time it contained an auditorium, dining hall, and kitchen. The next building to be erected was Stewart Library named after Joseph Spencer Stewart president from 1893–1903. The building later was known as the Will D. Young Social Science Building. In 1940 campus the roads on campus were still dirt so the state highway department graded a circular drive and drill field that had been used by the campus farm and at times been a cornfield.

During his tenure that the first PhD's joined the faculty. At the time the Governor of Georgia was Eugene Talmadge. Talmadge disagreed with president Roosevelt policies which caused NGC and other colleges to not receive their fair share of funds during the New Deal era. Talmadge's actions in 1941 also caused the removal of 10 schools from the Southern Association of Colleges and Schools (including NGC). His actions caused him to lose the next election to Attorney General Ellis Arnall.

In 1941 a large majority of NGC male students were called to active duty. Enrollment slowly declined because of students joining the service until it was arranged for an Army Specialized Training Program to be located at the college. In 1944, just before France was invaded, that program was dismantled but it was arranged for a reserve program to be installed. In 1945 with the war ending in Germany and the GI Bill available to many veterans students flocked to NGC. Construction then began on a new science building now known as Rogers Hall.

Senior College 1946–2013
The college was reinstated as a senior college. Things were looking up for the south's economy especially in North Georgia and the gains were felt at NGC by increase of those able to attend college.

Rogers years
With the enactment of the GI bill, end of the war, and Georgia emerging out of economic depression North Georgia College was bound to grow. Rogers had proven that his plans for the physical nature of campus were adequate and he was dedicated to improving the faculty. The college would offer two degrees: bachelor of arts and science. Majors at the time were English, business, education, psychology, chemistry, biology, math, physics/radio, history, romance languages, and physical training. With the addition of US 19 to Atlanta and GA 60 to Gainesville the college became more accessible. Although the college had just expanded its on-campus housing and had an available pool of students to draw from enrollment stagnated due to a lack of housing.

Hoag years
Merritt E. Hoag was named president in 1949 and served until 1970. Lewis Hall, a dormitory for women was completed in 1951 and was named for Willie B. Lewis the first female graduate of the college. Gaillard Hall was completed in 1953 as a barracks for the corps. It was named after Benjamin Palmer Gaillard a member of the faculty from 1874 to 1930. A second wing was added to Gaillard Hall in 1961. The President's House was also erected in 1953 behind Gaillard Hall. Memorial hall was next to be completed a large gymnasium with a stage and armory it was named in honor of graduates who had served in the military. During the 1950s citizens of Dahlonega provided gold for the state capitol building to be gold leafed. Inspired by the results a similar project was started to gold leaf the steeple of Price Memorial. The project wasn't complete until the 1970s. A new academic building was completed in 1965 and was named Dunlap Hall after Edgar Brown Dunlap Charmian of the Board of Regents. Another boys dormitory was added and an annex to Lewis Hall was added in 1966. The dorm was called Sirmon's hall after John Sirmons Registrar and Dean from 1932 until 1949. When former president Jonathan Clark Rogers died in 1967 the science building was renamed Rogers Hall in his honor. Cadet enrollment stagnated during the 1960s because of US involvement in Vietnam. A new student center was built in 1969 and was eventually named for President Hoag. In 1950 the old college farm ceased to be cultivated and was renovated to Pine Valley Recreation Area. It is still used by the campus for recreation and a simulated grenade course used by the corps.

Owen years
John H. Owen served as president for 22 years beginning his term in 1970. One of Owen's main focuses was improving the academic standards of the college. He did this by increasing enrollment and scholarships. In 1972 a new library was completed along with a plant of operations building. In 1976 Donovan hall was completed as a female dormitory. In 1981 the Chow Hall was completed. The old dining hall was eventually converted into a fine arts building. The next year another entrance was added along GA Highway 60. The nursing program was added in 1974 when the home economics program was dropped. When GA Highway 400 was widened in 1980 it increased the accessibility of the college.

In 1973 the student affairs began a program known as INTRO. The INTRO program consisted of bringing incoming students in for orientation sessions directed by upperclassmen. This type of program has been replicated by many universities. NGC's SGA gained strength during Owen's term. It was the first to be able to allocate fees for activities and programs in the university system. It was voted most outstanding in the university system from 1985–1991. In the early 1970s the basketball team switched its name from the cadets to the Saints after a Saint Bernard dog was purchased as the mascot. The Lady Saints originally began play as the Gold Diggers in 1971.

Modern era
The newest housing on the campus is called the suites and is co-ed.  The suites opened for students during the fall of 2010. In the modern era the college's population has continued to increase due to an increased commuter population. Owen retired in 1992 and was replaced temporarily by William F. Gerspacher. In 1993 Dr. Delmas J. Allen, the current Vice President of Academic Affairs was named as the president. Following Allen's resignation in 1996, Sherman R. Day was named acting president, a term which was extended until 1999. Nathaniel Hansford was president from 1999–2004.  David L. Potter became president in 2005 and resigned/retired in 2011.

Bonita C. Jacobs assumed the post of president in July 2011, and in doing so, became the college's first female president. She remained as president until the 2013 merger that created UNG, and remains president of the merged school.

List of presidents

References

North Georgia College and State University
Educational institutions established in 1873
1873 establishments in Georgia (U.S. state)